Denis Furtună (born 13 October 1999) is a Moldovan professional footballer who plays for CSF Bălți, as a defender.

International career 
He has represented Moldova at several youth levels. On 13 October 2020, he scored the only goal of the match as the Moldovan under-21 side achieved a historical home win against Belgium, thus making the "Red Devils" miss out on their qualification for the 2021 UEFA European Under-21 Championship.

Notes

References

External links

1999 births
Living people
Moldovan footballers
Association football defenders
FC Zimbru Chișinău players
Dacia Buiucani players
CSF Bălți players
Moldovan Super Liga players
Moldova youth international footballers
Moldova under-21 international footballers